The Algerian Women's Basketball Cup is an elimination basketball tournament for women held annually in Algeria. It started in 1982.

Finals
Below the finals of the competition since the first edition of 1968-69.

Rq
OC Alger (ex. IRB Alger)

Most successful clubs

See also
 
 Algerian Basketball Cup

References

Basketball competitions in Algeria
Algeria
Algeria
Women's basketball competitions in Africa